Carlos Pamplona was an Argentine actor. He starred in the 1962 film Una Jaula no tiene secretos.

References

External links

Argentine male film actors
Year of birth missing
Possibly living people